The Mount may refer to:

Geography
 Mount Maunganui, or "The Mount", a suburb of Tauranga, New Zealand
 The Mount, Belfast, an electoral ward in Northern Ireland, UK
 The Mounts, Allington, Devon, England, UK; a hamlet
 The Mount (York), a street in York, UK

Publications
 The Mount (novel), by Carol Emshwiller
 At-Tur, "The Mount", the 52nd sura of the Qur'an

Buildings
 The Mount (Gibraltar), former official residence of the senior officer of the Royal Navy
 The Mount (HM Prison), Hertfordshire England
 The Mount (hospital), Leeds, West Yorkshire, UK
 The Mount (Lenox, Massachusetts), home of Edith Wharton
 The Mount (stadium), former stadium in Catford, Greater London, England
 The Mount, North Yorkshire, a hunting tower 
 The Mount, Sheffield, a listed building in South Yorkshire

Schools
 Mount St. Mary's University, or "The Mount", a Catholic seminary in Emmittsburg, MD
 Mount Saint Michael Academy, or "The Mount", a high school in New York
 Mount Saint Vincent University, or "The Mount", in Nova Scotia, Canada
 The Mount School, York, England

See also 
 The Sermon on the Mount, a collection of sayings and teachings of Jesus Christ
 Mount (disambiguation)
 The Mountain (disambiguation)
 The Hill (disambiguation)